is a Japanese professional footballer who plays as a left back for J.League club Omiya Ardija, on loan from Júbilo Iwata.

Club statistics

References

External links

Profile at Júbilo Iwata

1996 births
Living people
Association football people from Shizuoka Prefecture
Meiji University alumni
Japanese footballers
Association football defenders
J1 League players
J2 League players
Júbilo Iwata players
Yokohama FC players
Omiya Ardija players